Panguraptor ("Pangu [a Chinese god] plunderer")  is a genus of coelophysid theropod dinosaur known from fossils discovered in Lower Jurassic rocks of southern China. The type and only known species is Panguraptor lufengensis. The generic name refers to the deity Pangu but also to the supercontinent Pangaea for which in a geological context the same characters are used: 盘古. Raptor means "seizer", "robber" in Latin. The specific name is a reference to the Lufeng Formation. The holotype specimen was recovered on 12 October 2007 from the Lufeng Formation of Yunnan, which is noted for sauropodomorph fossils. It was described in 2014 by You Hai-Lu and colleagues.

Description 
The holotype of Panguraptor, LFGT-0103, is the partial articulated skeleton of a subadult individual, including the skull, lower jaws, presacral vertebrae, first sacral vertebra, parts of the pectoral girdle and pelvic girdle, a left femur and most of the right limb. This specimen is likely a sub-adult due to its small size (approximately 2 meters long in life), large orbit, and unfused scapulocoracoids and astragalocalcaneum. However, it may have been close to adulthood due to having other bones which have fused.

The rather short skull is almost complete, although the premaxilla and rostral edge of the maxilla are missing and the nasals are partially obscured. The orbit is quite large but the antorbital fenestra is quite small. The exposed portions of the nasal are wide and smooth and do not show any sign of a sagittal crest present in some other basal theropods. The jugal is positioned similarly to that of C. rhodesiensis, although the quadratojugal is positioned more akin to that of Coelophysis ("Megapnosaurus") kayentakatae. The rostral end of the lower jaw is missing. Teeth are preserved in the dentary and maxilla, and are slightly recurved yet unserrated.

The centra of the cervical vertebrae gradually increase in length from the third to seventh cervical, then decrease once more to the tenth (last) cervical. The dorsal vertebrae are more compressed than those of Coelophysis bauri and C. rhodesiensis, and their neural spines are longer than they are high and so close to each other that they form a continuous wall along the dorsal vertebral column.

The scapula is long, with a scapular blade with a straight caudal edge and concave cranial edge. The hand has four digits, with metacarpals I and II being the widest and metatarsals II and III being the longest. The first digit also has a flattened and recurved claw, the largest found in the holotype.

The right ilium, though incomplete, has a stout pubic peduncle a prominent supracetabular crest. Distal portions of both ischia are preserved, and are straight with broad ends.

The femur has a large and offset head and a longitudinal bulge on the caudolateral surface of the shaft. The tibia and fibula are straight while the astragalus and calcaneum are unfused. Only one tarsal is exposed (likely tarsal IV) along with right metatarsals III, IV, and V and a few pedal digits. Metatarsal III is very long while IV and V taper distally.

Panguraptor can be distinguished from other coelophysids by the following traits:
 A diagonal ridge on the lateral surface of the maxilla, within the antorbital fossa.
 An elliptical fenestra (also known in Zupaysaurus) caudodorsal to the above-mentioned ridge.
 a distal tarsal IV with a hooked craniomedial corner.

Classification 
You et al. performed a phylogenetic analysis and found Panguraptor to be a coelophysid coelophysoid, in a clade with Coelophysis bauri, Coelophysis rhodesiensis, and Camposaurus but not "Megapnosaurus" kayentakatae. Panguraptor was placed in this clade due to having a very acute angle between the horizontal and ascending processes of the maxilla, a blind pocket within the antorbital fossa, a short lateral lamina of the lacrimal, and the ascending process of the jugal making an angle less than 75 degrees with its longitudinal axis. Per this analysis, Panguraptor would be the first coelophysoid known from Asia. It is also the second definite theropod genus known from the Lufeng Formation, after Sinosaurus. Other small coelophysoid specimens such as FMNH CUP 2089 (some forelimb bones) and FMNH CUP 2090 (some hindlimb bones) recovered from the Lufeng formation may belong to this species, although they have been provisionally referred to "Megapnosaurus" kayetakatae until further analysis.

References

Coelophysoids
Early Jurassic dinosaurs of Asia
Fossil taxa described in 2014
Paleontology in Yunnan